Taylor Malham (born May 20, 1999) is an American professional soccer player who plays as a midfielder for Racing Louisville FC of the National Women's Soccer League (NWSL). A native of Broken Arrow, Oklahoma, she played college soccer at Arkansas.

Early life and high school career
Malham was born on May 20, 1999, in Broken Arrow, Oklahoma, and attended Union High School in Tulsa. She played a part in Union's back-to-back undefeated seasons in 2015 and 2016, as the team won the OSSAA 6A state championship both years, scoring a goal in the latter championship game, and were named national champions in both seasons by TopDrawerSoccer.com. Malham was also a four-year starter on the basketball team at Union, averaging 17.2 points per game and finishing the 2016–17 season among the top scorers in her class. That season, she was also named to one of the all-state teams. Coming out of high school, Malham was rated as a three-star soccer recruit by TopDrawerSoccer.com and was the No. 88 ranked player nationally by IMG Academy. Malham played club soccer for TSC Hurricanes, and participated in the under-17 national team camp in December 2015.

In high school and club soccer, Malham played alongside Parker Goins; she went on to play with Goins at Arkansas and professionally in Louisville.

College career
Malham began her career at Arkansas in 2017. She started all 24 of the Razorbacks' games, the most of any freshman on the team. She made her collegiate debut on August 18, 2017, against SMU and scored the first goal of her college career two days later against North Texas on August 20, 2017. She recorded a total of six goals and two assists on the year. Three of her six goals were game-winners, including one against Ole Miss in the Hogs' SEC Tournament opener. Following the season, she was called up to the under-18 national team for a two-match tour in Switzerland, and went with Goins to San Diego for the under-19 national team training camp the following month.

Malham started all 23 Arkansas games as a sophomore, and played the second-most minutes of any player on the team. She led the team with nine assists and scored six goals in addition, including the game-winner against Missouri, two goals in the SEC Tournament, and one goal in the NCAA Tournament against Little Rock. Malham again started all 23 matches as a junior, finishing the year with eight goals and nine assists; she recorded a hat trick on September 8, 2019, in Arkansas' game against McNeese. She recorded three game-winning goals, including in one game in the SEC Tournament.

In the shortened 2020 season, Malham started all thirteen games. She recorded two goals, including the game-winner against Kentucky, and five assists. She decided to return for a final season as a graduate senior in 2021, when she started all 24 matches and scored eleven goals with an additional six assists. This season brought her total number of starts to 106, the most in program history. She recorded the game-winning goal in the NCAA Tournament Sweet Sixteen match against Notre Dame.

She was named first-team All-SEC in 2019 and 2021 and was a member of the SEC All-Tournament Team in her freshman and senior years.

Professional career
Malham was selected by Racing Louisville FC of the National Women's Soccer League on January 21, 2021. She opted to play the 2021 season with Arkansas before signing with Louisville. She was named as one of seven midfielders on Racing's 2022 preseason roster as a non-roster invitee, and she made her professional debut on March 30, 2022, as Louisville played the Chicago Red Stars.

References

1999 births
Living people
American women's soccer players
People from Broken Arrow, Oklahoma
Racing Louisville FC players
Women's association football forwards
National Women's Soccer League players
Arkansas Razorbacks women's soccer players